Clotton Hoofield is a civil parish in the Borough of Cheshire West and Chester and ceremonial county of Cheshire in England.  It has a population of 308.  The largest settlements in the parish are Clotton, Clotton Common and Hoofield.

See also

Listed buildings in Clotton Hoofield

References

External links

Villages in Cheshire
Civil parishes in Cheshire